The Brisbane Goannas are  in the Australian Women's Ice Hockey League. The team is based in Brisbane, Queensland, Australia. The Goannas Women’s Ice Hockey Club (GWIHC) is a non-profit incorporated association, governed by a volunteer management committee, focusing on the development of female players of all abilities and ages. Jad Daley is the President of the committee. Ice World Boondall is their home arena. The team's charity is Australian Prostate Cancer Research Centre – Queensland.

History
The Brisbane Goannas were one of the four founding teams in the Australian Women's Ice Hockey League, which began in 2007.

Roster

2016-2017 Season

Captains
 2011-12 Jemma Wallace (C), Melinda White (A), Laura Morris (A)
 2012-13 Jemma Wallace (C), Melinda White (A), Tracy Hocutt (A)
 2013-14 Jemma Wallace (C), Megan Gilchrist (A), 
 2014-15 Megan Herlihey (C), Megan Gilchrist (A), Brittany Gibbs (A)
 2015-16 Veronica Watson (C), Kelly Costa (A) 
 2016-17 Veronica Waston (C), Kelly Costa (A), Rosie Routledge (A)
 2017-18 Veronica Waston (C), Kelly Costa (A), Brittany Gibbs (A)

See also

Australian Women's Hockey League official site
Adelaide Rush official site
Brisbane Goannas official site
Melbourne Ice official Site 
Sydney Sirens official Site

References

External links 
Australian Women's Hockey League official site
Adelaide Adrenaline official site
Brisbane Goannas official site
Melbourne Ice official Site 
Sydney Sirens

Women's ice hockey in Australia
Ice hockey clubs established in 2005
Sporting clubs in Brisbane
2005 establishments in Australia
Ice hockey teams in Australia
Women's sports teams in Australia
Women's ice hockey teams
Australian Women's Ice Hockey League